Godmersham is a village and civil parish in the Ashford District of Kent, England. The village straddles the Great Stour river where it cuts through the North Downs and its land is approximately one third woodland, all in the far east and west on the escarpment of the North Downs. It is six miles north-east of Ashford on the A28 road midway between Ashford and Canterbury in an Area of Outstanding Natural Beauty with the North Downs Way and Pilgrims' Way traversing the parish.

The village is divided in two by the floodplain of the Stour. The parish civil includes Godmersham village itself, and Bilting. It shares many of its activities with the neighbouring parish of Crundale, a smaller parish to the east.

History
The first known record of Godmersham was AD824 when Beornwulf, King of Mercia, gave it as a whole to Wulfred, Archbishop of Canterbury. The village also is recorded in the Domesday Book. Bilting is thought to be older.

Although a significant number of residents work on the land, most of the community has adopted economically a status whereby its people work in Ashford, Canterbury and further afield. Many commute to London by train from Wye station. The village school in The Street closed in 1946 and the shop/post office in 1982. It is many years since there was a public house in the village, which describes a minority of civil parishes today.

Saint Lawrence Church
The ancient parish church is dedicated to St Lawrence the Martyr, it is part Saxon, part 12th-century (Norman), and was restored in 1864, it contains a carving considered to be one of the earliest representations of Thomas Becket.

Godmersham Park

Godmersham Park House was built in 1732 and eventually became the property of Edward Austen Knight, brother of Jane Austen who was known to have visited often. Her novel Mansfield Park depicts similar characters and scenes as those visible at the start of the 19th century, and in the case of architecture still present. The house is currently the home of the Association of British Dispensing Opticians College. A drawing of Godmersham Park is also set to appear as the background for the £10 note due to enter circulation in 2017, which will predominantly feature the portrait of Austen allegedly drawn by her sister Cassandra.

Notable residents
Samuel Pegge, Antiquarian, Vicar of Godmersham 1730-1750.

In popular culture

Author Russell Hoban repurposes Godmersham as "Good Mercy" in his 1980, post apocalyptic novel Riddley Walker.

References

External links

 Godmersham Village Hall Details at Ashford.gov
 NGS Gardens Open for Charity

Villages in Kent
Villages in the Borough of Ashford
Civil parishes in Ashford, Kent